Gory v Kolver NO (in full Gory v Kolver NO and Others (Starke and Others Intervening)) is a decision of the Constitutional Court of South Africa which ruled that a same-sex life partner was entitled to inherit the estate of the other partner who died intestate.

Gory and Brooks were in a permanent same-sex life partnership, and had had a symbolic ceremony similar to a wedding to express their intention to be together for the rest of their lives. Mark Gory sought to be recognised as the sole intestate heir of his late same-sex partner, Henry Harrison Brooks, who had died intestate on April 30, 2005, without leaving a spouse or descendants. The court's decision was predicated on the fact that Gory and Brooks had not had the option of formalising their partnership.

The court ruled that the Intestate Succession Act, 1987, which granted the right of intestate succession to spouses but not to same-sex life partners, unfairly discriminated on the basis of sexual orientation. The Act was therefore invalid because it violated section 9 of the Constitution. To rectify the unconstitutionality, the court read the words "or partner in a permanent same-sex life partnership in which the partners have undertaken reciprocal duties of support" into section 1(1) of the Act after the word "spouse."

The court had already ruled in Minister of Home Affairs v Fourie that marriage had to be extended to same-sex couples; however, the order in that case was suspended for one year to allow Parliament to rectify the inequality. The Gory case came before the courts during this one-year period; indeed, the Constitutional Court's final decision was handed down only seven days before the Civil Union Act became law. In its judgment the Court indicated that rights extended to unmarried same-sex couples by judicial decisions would not automatically be removed when same-sex marriage became legal, though Parliament would be able to modify them by legislation.

References

External links
 Judgment of the Constitutional Court
 Judgment of the High Court, Transvaal Provincial Division

South African property case law
Constitutional Court of South Africa cases
2006 in case law
2006 in LGBT history
2006 in South African law
South African same-sex union case law
Law of succession in South Africa